Kathy Buchanan (born 1971) is an Australian author and director.

Biography 
Kathy Buchanan was born in Michigan where she grew up. She also lived in Colorado, where her first jobs included working at Warner Bros Movie World as a stunt-woman in the Western Action and Police Academy Stunt Shows. She worked as a journalist on Esquire magazine and other glossy magazines in London and has written several books including her tween fiction series Exchanging Lives (Scholastic, 2009) which has been published in Germany, Thailand and China and the sequel Roman Holiday (Scholastic, 2010). She has also published nonfiction with Happy Endings: The Ultimate Movie and Book Guide for Women (Penguin, 2005), Quit for Chicks (Penguin, 2003), which was also published in Malaysia  and Charm School: The Modern Girl's Complete Handbook of Etiquette (Penguin, 2003) which was also published in Latvia. She is also the book reviewer for popular glossy magazines such as Marie Claire.

References

External links 
Official website for Kathy Buchanan

Living people
1971 births
American freelance journalists